Zhongsheng station is a railway station on Line 10 of the Nanjing Metro.

References 

Railway stations in Jiangsu
Nanjing Metro stations
Railway stations in China opened in 2005